In a cashless society, financial transactions are not conducted with physical banknotes or coins, but instead with digital information (usually an electronic representation of money). Cashless societies have existed from the time when human society came into existence, based on barter and other methods of exchange, and cashless transactions have also become possible in modern times using credit cards, debit cards, mobile payments, and digital currencies such as bitcoin. However, this article focuses on the term "cashless society" in the sense of a move towards a society in which cash is replaced by its digital equivalent—in other words, legal tender (money) exists, is recorded, and is exchanged only in electronic digital form.

Such a concept has been discussed widely, particularly because the world is experiencing a rapid and increasing use of digital methods of recording, managing, and exchanging money in commerce, investment and daily life in many parts of the world, and transactions which would historically have been undertaken with cash are often now undertaken electronically. Some countries now set limits on transactions and transaction values for which non-electronic payment may be legally used.

History
Early ideas of a cashless society were expressed by Edward Bellamy in his novel Looking Backward. The trend towards the use of non-cash transactions and settlement in daily life began during the 1990s when electronic banking became common. By the 2010s digital payment methods were widespread in many countries, with examples including intermediaries such as PayPal, digital wallet systems such as Apple Pay, contactless and NFC payments by electronic card or smartphone, and electronic bills and banking, all in widespread use. At this point cash had become actively disfavored in some kinds of transaction which would historically have been very ordinary to pay with physical tender, and larger cash amounts were in some situations treated with suspicion, due to its versatility and ease of use in money laundering and financing of terrorism. Additionally, payment with a large amount of cash has been actively prohibited by some suppliers and retailers, to the point of coining the expression of a "war on cash".
The 2016 United States User Consumer Survey Study claims that 75% of respondents preferred a credit or debit card as their payment method while only 11% of respondents preferred cash.
Since the founding of both companies in 2009, digital payments can now be made by methods such as Venmo and Square. Venmo allows individuals to make direct payments to other individuals without having cash accessible. Square is an innovation that allows primarily small businesses to receive payments from their clients.

By 2016, only about 2% of the value transacted in Sweden was by cash, and only about 20% of retail transactions were in cash. Fewer than half of bank branches in the country conducted cash transactions. The move away from cash is attributed to banks convincing employers to use direct deposit in the 1960s, banks charging for checks starting in the 1990s, banks launching the convenient Swish smartphone-to-phone payment system in 2012, and the launch of iZettle for small merchants to accept credit cards in 2011.

Research
Among the first sociological studies about cashless societies, see Aldo Haesler, Sociologie de l'argent et postmodernité, Geneva & Paris 1995.

Measurement

Share of payments

A common measure of how close to a "cashless society" a country is becoming is some measure of the number of cashless payments or person to person transactions are done in that country. For instance, the Nordic countries conduct more cashless transactions than most other Europeans. Levels of cash in circulation can widely differ among two countries with a similar measure of cashless transactions.

Amount of cash in circulation

Even though a cashless society is widely discussed, most countries are increasing their currency supply. Exceptions are South Africa whose supply of banknotes fluctuates wildly compared to most nations, and Sweden which has significantly reduced its currency supply since 2007. China's currency has decreased from 2017 to 2018

Amount of cash in circulation (historical)

The amount of cash in circulation was much lower in past decades in all countries except Sweden. The oldest comparative figures at Bank for International Settlements were from 1978 and only including the USD and 10 other currencies.

Legal status

United States 

Under a Massachusetts law dating back to 1978, no retailer may "discriminate against a cash buyer by requiring the use of credit". It was the only U.S. state to have such a law until March 2019, when New Jersey passed similar legislation; car rentals, parking garages, and airport stores have exceptions under the legislation. The bill came shortly after the city of Philadelphia passed a similar law. San Francisco has also banned cashless stores. Similarly, Rhode Island became the third U.S. state to outlaw cashless businesses when its ban took effect on 1 July 2019. A requirement in New York City that businesses accept cash took effect on 19 November 2020. A similar law was enacted in the District of Columbia in December 2020.

Advantages of a cashless society

Reduced business risks and costs 
Cashless payments eliminate several risks, including counterfeit money (though stolen cards are still a risk), theft of cash by employees, miscounting of change, and burglary or robbery of cash. The costs of physical security, physically processing cash (withdrawing from the bank, transporting, counting) are also reduced once a business goes completely cashless, as is the risk that the business will not have enough cash on hand to make the change. Cashless payments are also known to be more efficient and safer compared to cash payments, and they can always be traced back afterwards as well.

Reducing transmittal of disease via cash
Cash provides a good home for disease-causing organisms (i.e. Staphylococcus aureus, Salmonella species, Escherichia coli, COVID-19, etc.). However, cash has been found to be less likely to transmit disease than commonly touched items such as credit card terminals and pinpads. Such concerns prompted the German central bank, to state that "Cash poses no particular risk of infection for public".

Transaction speed 
Restaurant chain Sweetgreen found cashless locations (with customers using payment cards or the chain's mobile app) could process transactions 15% faster.

Elimination of high-denomination notes for purposes of reducing criminal activity 
One significant societal advantage cited by proponents is the difficulty of money laundering, tax evasion, performing illegal transactions, and funding illegal activity in a cashless society. Many countries have regulated, restricted, or banned private digital currencies such as Bitcoin, partly to prevent illegal transactions. Large amounts of value can also be stored in real estate, antiques, or commodities like diamonds, gold, silver, and platinum.

Some have proposed a "reduced cash" system, where small bills and coins are available for anonymous, everyday transactions, but high-denomination notes are eliminated. This would make the amount of cash needed to move large amounts of value physically awkward and easier to detect. Large notes are also the most valuable to counterfeit. The United Kingdom declared only banknotes of £5 or less were legal tender near the end of World War II on 16 April 1945 due to fear of Nazi counterfeiting, although a £5 note then had the purchasing power of £217.22 in 2020, over four times larger than the current largest note of £50. On 14 July 1969, the federal government of the United States declared that banknotes of over $100 in value would remain legal tender, but any notes in government hands would be destroyed and that no new notes of those denominations would be printed in the future, although such notes were last printed in 1945, 24 years earlier. Canada did the same thing with the CAD$1000 banknote beginning on 12 May 2000. Sweden printed 10,000kr banknotes in 1939 and 1958, but declared them invalid after 31 December 1991. Singapore announced on 2 July 2014, that they would no longer produce the SGD$10,000 banknote, and it was no longer issued as of 1 October 2014. The European Central Bank no longer issues the €500 denomination euro banknotes as of 27 April 2019.

Better collection of economic data 
Rather than conducting "costly and periodic" surveys and sampling of real-world transactions, "real data" collected on citizens' spending can assist in devising and implementing policies that are deduced from actual data. With recorded financial transactions, the government can better track the movement of the money through financial records which enables them to track the black money and illegal transactions taking place in the country.

Easier consumer budgeting 
As digital payments are made, transactions are kept in records. Cashless payments facilitate the tracking of spending expenditure and record the movement of money. Having recorded transactions, it can help citizens to refine their budget more efficiently because people can see their recorded transactions in their bank account and know where their ingoings and outgoings are occurring.

Concerns

Lack of privacy 
In a digitized economy, payment made will be recorded digitally (cash payments are also typically recorded). With digitally-recorded transactions, certain institutions such as the seller may have potential access to this information (though the record is likely to be anonymous to the seller). Such transactions could allow businesses a way to build an understanding of their customers based on observed spending patterns.

The issue of data mining also comes into place as countries head towards a cashless society. Cashless transactions leave a record in the database of the company as one makes a payment, and this information becomes a way for the prediction of future events. Through a large number of records, data mining then allows the organization to compile a profile of an individual through its records in the database.

Going all-digital, these data retrieved from transactions lead to widespread surveillance where individuals can be tracked by both corporations and the government. These records might also be available to hackers and could be made public after a data breach.

Problems for the unbanked 
Cashless systems can be problematic for people who currently rely on cash, who are concentrated in certain populations such as the poor, disabled, elderly, undocumented immigrants, and youth. Electronic transactions require a deposit account (in a bank or other deposit-taking financial institution) and some familiarity with the payment system. Many people in impoverished areas are underbanked or unbanked. In the United States, almost one-third of the population lacked the full range of basic financial services in 2012. In 2011, an FDIC survey found that approximately one-quarter of households whose annual income was less than $15,000 had no bank account. Nationwide, 7.7% of people in United States did not have bank accounts, with levels over 20% in some cities and rural counties, and over 40% in some census tracts, as of 2016.

As part of its Smart Nation initiative, Singapore has been moving towards a cashless economy. In 2017, 14.4% of the country's population was over 65 years old, and the majority of seniors still used cash as their only method of payment. Not used to digital payment methods, troubleshooting issues such as managing lost cards or passwords and managing their expenses can create potential trouble for anyone transitioning from cash.

Digital fraud 
When payment transactions are stored in servers, it increases the risks of unauthorized breaches by hackers. Financial cyber attacks and digital crime also form a greater risks when going cashless. Many companies already suffer data breaches, including of payment systems. Electronic accounts are vulnerable to unauthorized access and transfer of funds to another account or unauthorized purchases.

Attacks on or accidental outages of telecommunication infrastructure also prevent electronic payments from working, unlike cash transactions which can continue with minimal infrastructure.

Centralized control 

Opponents point out that an entirely cashless system, in addition to tracking all transactions, would enable a central government to:
 Enforce a transaction tax on every person-to-person payment
 Eliminate the storage of cash as a means to escape nominal negative interest rates, which are used to fight deflation by discouraging savings (most effective if combined with bans on barter, private currencies like bitcoin, and storage of precious metals like gold). Certain types of money could be set to "expire" and be worthless if not spent in specific ways or by specific times. This is also possible with cash, if the government allows high inflation or lets its currency undergo a devaluation.
 Totalitarian regimes could conduct more effective mass surveillance and quickly prevent certain individuals from buying anything or earning any money
 Restrict the type of consumer goods that can be purchased with a certain amount of money (and parents might be able to do the same with allowance money)

Criticism in Sweden
Sweden is one of the best examples of the results of efforts to create a cashless society. Sweden is exceptional in that the amount of cash in circulation has reduced substantially. Swedish society changed profoundly from 2000 to 2017 due to attempts to replace all cash with digital payment methods. The concept of cash-free bank branches began in Sweden between 2000 and 2005, with a cashless branch being a step towards an upcoming closure of that branch. From around 2008, Swedish banks began giving special hardware to their customers that could be used to process financial transactions (like digital payments of invoices) from home. People still had the choice to use cash, however, and those who so wished could still do business in cash at the bank offices that remained.

This trend began around 2008, and peaked in connection with the 2015–17 exchange of all Swedish coins and banknotes (except for the 10 kronor coin). According to the banks' head offices, cash was no longer required as withdrawals and deposits were possible (in limited amounts) through machines. But for "safety regulations", the maximum amount a bank customer could withdraw was about 5,000 to 10,000 SEK per week, and similar "security rules" for deposits were established as well. Later, all the major regular banks with branches began an enforced process of either closing down branches or making them "cash-free". Today very few cash handling bank branches still exist.

The limited availability of cash in Sweden has caused difficulties for smaller boutiques, shops, and convenience stores, which depend on cash, as they can no longer deposit their daily takings or obtain any change. Non-profit organisations, which are very common in Sweden, have also experienced an outsized impact. In response, Swedish banks have introduced a mobile telephone payment system known as Swish. But this system has suffered from many problems.

The banks (and initially media as well) have dismissed complaints about the change as "a problem for elderly people" only, essentially claiming that some were only struggling to learn new technology, rather than being unhappy with a totally new transaction method. Opponents of the change, however, contend that the technological excitement has changed too much too fast, saying that many dangers lurk in the reeds. Concerns have been expressed about a rising number of fraudulent transactions, and the fast development of quantum computers contributes to fears of hacking within the system. The debate about a cashless Sweden became more complicated when the Swedish authority Myndigheten för Samhällsskydd och Beredskap—MSB or "the Authority for Community Protection and Preparedness" in their writing "Om Kriget Eller Krisen Kommer" ("If war or crisis comes") contained a list of items to store permanently at home to be prepared, which includes "cash in small denominations". A wave of negative criticism followed in Sweden from experts outside the banking sphere expressing their concerns.

The former head of police, Björn Eriksson, started a movement in the spring of 2016 known as Kontantupproret or "The Cash Petition". This movement has quickly grown to a considerable size, with many contributors describing troubles caused by the increasingly hostile attitude expressed by banks against cash. The range of complaints covers a wide variety of issues. For instance, the well-known TV3 figure Robert Aschberg got mad after having paid at a chemist with the Swish system via his mobile phone, because he almost immediately received an advertisement from the same pharmacy, raising privacy concerns. Svante Linusson, professor of mathematics, claims that "the liquidation of cash is slowly destroying our democracy". A billiard club in Malmö was almost forced to close after their bank of 20 years refused to acknowledge them as a customer after the billiard club refused any other payments but cash (the bank claimed that the cash is not traceable in their crime investigation activities). A traditional summer market in northern Lycksele went into bankruptcy after a computer error. Because people had been required to pay with phones (Swish) and cards, there was not enough money available for them to conduct business in their market.

In general new money laundry laws require evidence of sources for higher amounts of cash. The banks in Sweden blame EU laws, but the EU laws allow transactions of below €15,000, while Swedish banks require evidence and can refuse to accept or confiscate cash without lower limit and have high requirements of documentation.

See also 

 Global economy
 Digital currency
 Virtual currency
 Legal tender
 Mass surveillance
 
 Cashierless store
 Contactless payment
 Online banking
 Digital banking

References

External links
 A Cashless Society Working Party, Institute and Faculty of Actuaries (UK)

 
International finance